Redfield Proctor (1831–1908) was a U.S. Senator for Vermont from 1891 to 1908. Senator Proctor may also refer to:

Fletcher D. Proctor (1860–1911), Vermont State Senate
Frank M. Proctor (died 1892), Nevada State Senate
Haydn Proctor (1903–1996), New Jersey State Senate
John E. Proctor (1844–1944), Florida State Senate
Mortimer R. Proctor (1889–1968), Vermont State Senate
Redfield Proctor Jr. (1879–1957), Vermont State Senate